Wait till the Sun Shines, Nellie is a 1952 film drama directed by Henry King, sharing the name of a popular song. Starring Jean Peters and David Wayne, it charts the life of an Illinois family between the 1890s and 1920s.

Plot
Expecting to honeymoon in Chicago and live there, newlywed Nellie is disappointed when she and Ben Halper disembark from their train at a small town in Illinois, where he has chosen to live and run a barber shop.

Ben lies to his wife, claiming the shop is only rented, as is their home, when he has actually purchased both. Nellie gives birth to their two children, but wants so much to see Chicago that when Ben is away, she accepts an offer from Ed Jordan, a hardware store owner, to visit the big city together. In a train wreck, Nellie is killed.

The thought that his wife might have been unfaithful haunts Ben over the coming years. His children grow up, and Ben Jr. decides against his father's wishes to go to Chicago as a dancer in a vaudeville act.
  
Ben becomes a grandfather and his son serves in World War I, where he is injured and can no longer dance. Ben Jr. takes a job with a Chicago racketeer named Mike Kava, to his father's shame. One day, both Ben Jr. and his boss are gunned down by machine guns.

An elderly Ben Halper looks back on his life with regret, his greatest remaining pleasure being that his granddaughter, Nellie, grows up to strongly resemble the woman he long ago married.

Cast
Jean Peters as Nellie Halper
David Wayne as Ben Halper
Hugh Marlowe as Ed Jordan
Albert Dekker as Lloyd Slocum
Helene Stanley as Eadie Jordan
Tommy Morton as Benny Halper, Jr.
Joyce MacKenzie as Bessie Jordan
Alan Hale, Jr. as George Oliphant
Richard Karlan as Mike Kava
William Walker as Robert Waverly Ferris

References

External links

1952 films
20th Century Fox films
Films scored by Alfred Newman
Films directed by Henry King
Films set in Illinois
Films set in the 1890s
Films set in the 1900s
Films set in the 1910s
Films set in the 1920s
1950s historical drama films
American historical drama films
1952 drama films
1950s English-language films
1950s American films